Lolassonn Djouhan (born 18 May 1991 in Montargis) is a French athlete specialising in the discus throw. He represented his country at the 2017 World Championships missing the final by two centimetres.
 
His personal best in the event is 66.66 metres set in 2021 in Stade Fernand Bonnieu, Montélimar.

International competitions

References

1991 births
Living people
French male discus throwers
World Athletics Championships athletes for France
People from Montargis
Sportspeople from Loiret
French Athletics Championships winners
Athletes (track and field) at the 2020 Summer Olympics
Olympic athletes of France